James Franklin Devendorf (April 6, 1856–October 9, 1934), was a pioneer  real estate developer and philanthropist. Devendorf and attorney Frank Hubbard Powers (1864-1921), founded the Carmel Development Company in 1902. He became the "Father" of an artists and writers' colony that became Carmel-by-the-Sea, California, which included the Carmel Highlands, California. Devendorf spent the next 30 years of his life developing Carmel and the Carmel Highlands into a special community of painters, writers, and musicians.

Early life 

Devendorf was born in Lowell, Michigan, on April 6, 1856. He was one of the three children of Thomas Jefferson Devendorf and Grace Congdon. His father was a merchant and died when Devendorf was three years old. His mother remarried to a Methodist minister, A. W. Gray. Devendorf attended public school at Lowell.

Professional background

In 1874, the family moved to California where he became interested in business and land development. He got a job as a clerk at Hale Bros. Department Store in San Jose, California. On February 19, 1879, in San Jose, he married Lilliana Augusta "Lillie" Potter (1859-1940), a music teacher at the  College of the Pacific in Santa Clara, California. They had five children.

In 1901, Devendorf had property in San Jose, Morgan Hill, Gilroy, and Stockton. He decided to trade some of his land holdings for land in Carmel.

Carmel Development Company

In 1902, Devendorf purchased land in Carmel from developer and real estate agent Santiago J. Duckworth, who, in 1889, wanted to build a Catholic summer resort. San Francisco attorney Frank Hubbard Powers (1864-1920) became his partner and they formed the Carmel Development Company on November 25, 1902. 

On November 25, 1902, Devendorf became partners with Powers and formed the Carmel Development Company to operate at the Carmel Development Company Building in the town of Carmel-by-the-Sea. Powers provided the capital and did the legal work of the corporation. Devendorf was general manager and oversaw subdividing and developing the land.

Devendorf hired engineer Henry Fisher to layout the village of Carmel. A new subdivision map of the town was filed with the County Recorder in 1902. Under Devendorf's direction, Carmel became a colony of artists and writers and was established as a city in 1903. By 1904, there were 75 permanent residents, several stores, a restaurant, school, and Carmel City's first hotel, Hotel Carmelo. In the spirit of planting Monterey pines down the center of Ocean Avenue, Devendorf renamed the hotel the Pine Inn.

By 1905, Devendorf used the Carmel Development Company to donate lots for the construction of a community church and school. Devendorf was one of the founders of the Carmel Arts and Crafts Club to support artistic works. In 1927, the club was replaced with the Carmel Art Association. He donated the site that would become the Carmel Forest Theater; and gave land for the Devendorf Park.

  

In 1906, Devendorf, through the Carmel Development Company, purchased land from local ranchers five miles south of Carmel where he developed the Carmel Highlands. In 1915, he developed the Highlands Inn in the Carmel Highlands, which was a resort hotel. His friend, marine artist William Frederic Ritschel helped Devendorf design the Highlands Inn. He sold the Highlands Inn in 1922.

After the 1906 San Francisco earthquake, more lots were sold because of relocated residents. By 1909, the Carmel Development Company was advertising "Carmel-By-The-Sea" round trip railroad rates to get people to come down to the town. A row of pine trees was planted down the middle of Ocean Avenue because of Devendorf's love for trees and the beautiful environment of the Monterey Peninsula. By 1913, there were 550 residents in Carmel with thousands of summer visitors. The Carmel Realty Company publish a map and brochure of Carmel in 1913, advertising a "A town in a Pine Forest." The town included a post office, Wells Fargo Express office, public school, and free library.

Death
In May 1934, Devendorf visited the Wildcat Canyon area of the Carmel Highlands on horseback searching for water for the Highlands. There was a storm and Devendorf got ill and never recovered. He had a heart attack soon after this trip. Devendorf died on October 9, 1934, at the age of 78, at his home in Oakland, California. His funeral was at his family home in Oakland.

Legacy

Devendorf's daughter, Edwina Dupre Devendorf (1881-1954), became a painter and sculptor. In 1949, she made a bronze bust of her father that was dedicated at the Devendorf Park, which was named in his honor. The park is located on Ocean Avenue at the entrance to town. The plague says:
 The mountain behind the city of Carmel was named after him.

References

External links

 Carmel Heritage website
 The Carmel Monterey Peninsula Art Colony: A History

1856 births
1934 deaths
People from Carmel-by-the-Sea, California
People from Michigan